Maria Chiara Carrozza (born 16 September 1965) is an Italian physicist, engineer and politician. She was Minister of Education, University and Research between April 2013 and February 2014 in the Letta Cabinet. She has been president of the National Research Council of Italy since April 2021.

Biography
Maria Chiara Carrozza received the Laurea degree in physics from the University of Pisa, Italy, in 1990 and a PhD in engineering at Scuola Superiore Sant'Anna (SSSA), in 1994.

Since November 2006, she has been a Full Professor of Biomedical Engineering and Robotics at SSSA. In the period 2007 to 2013 she was the Rector of SSSA, and the youngest rector in Italy on her appointment. In 2013, she was elected Member of the Italian Parliament; from April 28, 2013, until February 2014 she was the Italian Minister for Education and Research; from March 2014 to May 2014 she was Member of the Committee on Productive activities, Commerce and Tourism of the Italian Parliament; since June 2014 she has been a Member of the Committee on Foreign Affairs of the Italian Parliament. She has scientific and coordination responsibilities within several national and international research projects. Her research interests are in rehabilitation engineering, wearable robotics, cybernetic hands, robotic devices for upper and lower limb functional replacement and augmentation, tactile sensors. She currently coordinates a group of 30 people, comprising Ph.D. students, post-docs and assistant professors. She is author of several scientific papers (more than 80 ISI papers and more than 120 papers in referred conference proceedings) and of 12 patents.

References

1965 births
Living people
People from Pisa
University of Pisa alumni
Sant'Anna School of Advanced Studies alumni
Academic staff of Marconi University
Italian women academics
Education ministers of Italy
Letta Cabinet
Italian women engineers
Women government ministers of Italy
21st-century Italian women politicians
20th-century Italian engineers
21st-century Italian engineers
20th-century women engineers
21st-century women engineers
Democratic Party (Italy) politicians